The 1998-1999 season was FK Sarajevo's 50th season in history, and their 5th consecutive season in the top flight of Bosnian football.

Players

Squad

(Captain)

Statistics

Kit

Competitions

Premier League

League table

References

FK Sarajevo seasons
Sarajevo